Raphael Viashima Ayagwa (born 13 February 1998) is a Nigerian professional footballer who plays as a midfielder for Aswan.

Club career 
Lobi Stars FC 2016-2017

Raphael Ayagwa used to play for Plateau United F.C. in Jos, Plateau state, before he signed for Norwegian side Lillestrøm on 15 August 2018. He left the club on 25 June 2019 after getting his contract terminated by mutual consent.

On 11 January 2020, Ayagwa joined USL Championship side FC Tulsa.

International career 
Ayagwa was called up for the Nigerian national team and made a single appearance for Nigeria against Benin on 19 August 2017.

References

1998 births
Living people
Lobi Stars F.C. players
Plateau United F.C. players
Lillestrøm SK players
FC Tulsa players
Eliteserien players
Nigerian footballers
Association football midfielders
People from Gboko
Nigerian expatriate footballers
Expatriate footballers in Norway
Nigerian expatriate sportspeople in Norway
Expatriate soccer players in the United States
Nigerian expatriate sportspeople in the United States